Elphinstone Research Centre is a medical research centre, part of the Charles River Laboratories, east of Edinburgh, south of Tranent, in East Lothian.

In the 1970s it was the site of Inveresk Research International. Inveresk had been founded in 1957 and was situated in the former offices of the Institute of Seaweed Research.

It is situated to the south of Tranent, between the B6414 and B6371, north-east of Elphinstone. The site employs around 1300 people.

References

External links
 Gazetteer for Scotland

Buildings and structures in East Lothian
Laboratories in the United Kingdom
Medical research institutes in the United Kingdom
Pharmaceutical industry in the United Kingdom
Pharmaceutical research institutes
Research institutes in Scotland